Quest for a Heart is a 2007 British/Finnish/Russian/German animated film directed by Pekka Lehtosaari. It is based on the Rölli character created by Allu Tuppurainen, and while it is the third Rölli film (previous films are Rolli: Amazing Tales from 1991 and Rollo and the Spirit of the Woods from 2001), it is also the first Rölli animation. It is also one of the first feature-length animated films produced in Finland, before that Santa Claus and the Magic Drum was made in 1996 and The Emperor's Secret in 2006. With its over 5 million euro budget, Quest for a Heart is one of the most expensive Finnish films.

The film won the Best Animation Award at the German Schlingel Film Festival in October 2008 and at the Chicago Children's Film Festival in November 2008.

Plot
The story revolves around Rölli the troll who accompanies a spunky elf girl named Milli on a quest to find a magical heart that will save the trolls' village from being turned to stone, despite the fact that trolls and elves are completely opposite in nature.

Cast

Finnish cast
Allu Tuppurainen as Rölli
Saija Lentonen as Millie the Elf
Esa Saario as Elder/Sage of the Sauna/Narrator
Jyrki Kovaleff as Atonal
Matti Ranin as Longwind
Aarre Karén as Footman
Maria Järvenhelmi as Princess / Frog
Pekka Lehtosaari as additional voices

English cast
Mackenzie Crook as Rölli
Lisa Stansfield as Millie the Elf
Roger Hammond as Elder
Gary Martin as Sage of the Sauna
Jim McManus as Atonal
Ian Thompson as Longwind
William Vanderpuye as Footman
Jo Wyatt as Princess / Frog
James Greene as Narrator

Home media
The film was released on DVD in most European territories, and was released as a direct-to-video film in United Kingdom on DVD by HB Films.

References

External links

Finnish animated films
Finnish fantasy adventure films
2007 animated films
German animated fantasy films
British animated fantasy films
Russian animated fantasy films
German fantasy adventure films
Films about trolls
Films about elves
Animated films based on Norse mythology
2000s fantasy adventure films
British fantasy adventure films
Russian fantasy adventure films
2007 multilingual films
Finnish multilingual films
German multilingual films
British multilingual films
Russian multilingual films
2000s British films
2000s German films